Waligóra  and Wyrwidąb  are two fictional twin brothers who were the characters of the fairy tale originating from Poland. They were a personification of brotherhood and the example of the benefits from the cooperation.

In fairy tales 
In one version of their fairy tale, they were orphans whose mother died after birth in the forest. Waligóra has been cared for by the female wolf, while Wyrwidąb, by the female bear. They were both extremely strong, with Waligóra being capable of destroying the mountain with one punch, and Wyrwidąb, being able to tear oak trees from the ground. Brothers working together had saved a kingdom, defeating the dragon, that terrorized it. After doing that, they were awarded by the king, who let them marry his 2 daughters.

Philologist and folklorist Julian Krzyżanowski, establisher of the Polish Folktale Catalogue according to the international index, classified tales about the heroic duo as type T 300B, "Smok I Waligóra" ("The Dragon and Waligóra"). Thus, his typing is closely related to the international ATU type ATU 300, "The Dragon-Slayer".

In other fairy tales
According to philologist and folklorist Julian Krzyżanowski (pl), Waligóra and Wyrwidąb may also be the name of the companions of the hero in the Aarne-Thompson-Uther Index type ATU 301, "The Three Stolen Princesses" or Polish Bracia zdradziecy ("The Traitorous Brothers").

Citations

Notes

References

Bibliography 
 Kazimierz Władysław Wójcicki, Waligóra i Wyrwidąb in Klechdy, starożytne podania i powieści ludowe, Grudziądz, Zakłady Graficzne Wiktora Kulerskiego (Gazeta Grudziądzka), 1922

External links
 The legend of Wyrwidąb and Waligóra by K. Glinski at Polish Wikisource.

Legendary Polish people
Polish fairy tales
Brother duos
Dragonslayers
Fictional characters with superhuman strength
Fictional twins
ATU 300-399